Contrastive rhetoric is the study of how a person's first language and his or her culture influence writing in a second language or how a common language is used among different cultures. The term was first coined by the American applied linguist Robert Kaplan in 1966 to denote eclecticism and subsequent growth of collective knowledge in certain languages. It was widely expanded from 1996 to today by Finnish-born, US-based applied linguist Ulla Connor, among others. Since its inception the area of study has had a significant impact on the exploration of intercultural discourse structures that extend beyond the target language's native forms of discourse organization. The field brought attention to cultural and associated linguistic habits in expression of English language.

This acceptance of dialect geography was especially welcomed in the United States on ESL instruction, as an emphasis on particular style in spoken-language and writing skills was previously dominated in both English as a second language (ESL) and English as a foreign language (EFL) classes.

Trends

Since 1966, when Kaplan's original work on contrastive rhetoric appeared, and 1996, when Ulla Connor's book on contrastive rhetoric reinvigorated interest in the area, new trends have appeared in research approaches and methods. Mainly the works of Jacques Derrida in the 1970s illustrating the differences in a word's meanings in reference to other words around it is a significant contribution (e.g. Don't forget to turn right at the intersection, vs. He insisted he was right, although his argument made no sense, vs. I have a right to speak freely.). The change of accepting the linguistic depth of a language by negating negative social barriers has been affected by three major developments—the acknowledgment of more genres with specific textual requirements, increased awareness of the social contexts of writing, and the need for an alternative conceptual framework that takes a more critical perspective of contrastive rhetoric—have motivated scholars of contrastive rhetoric to adjust and supplement research approaches in their work.

EAP and other genres
First, there was a marked increase in the types of written texts considered the purview of second language writing around the world. English for Academic Purposes (EAP) classes teach other types of writing besides the student essay required in college classes.  Other important genres are the academic research article, research report, and grant proposal.  Writing for professional purposes, such as business, is also now considered a legitimate type of second language writing and worthy of research and teaching.

Socially situated writing
Second, in addition to the expansion of the genre, textual analysis has moved contrastive rhetoric to emphasize the social situation of writing.  Today, writing is increasingly regarded as being socially situated; each situation may entail special consideration to audience, purposes, level of perfection, and correspondingly may require varying amounts of revision, collaboration, and attention to detail. The expectations and norms of discourse communities or communities of practice (cultural and disciplinary) may shape these situational expectations and practices. This is where contrastive rhetoric overlaps with social constructionism, which sees approaches to textual meaning as dynamic, socio-cognitive activities.  Instead of analyzing what texts "mean", the interest is to understand how they construct meaning.  Bazerman and Prior (2004, p. 6) pose three questions to guide the analysis of writing:

 "What does the text talk about?"
 "How do texts influence audiences?"
 "How do texts come into being?"

Critical contrastive rhetoric
Third, in response to criticisms that challenge traditional contrastive rhetoric, an alternative conceptual framework known as critical contrastive rhetoric has been established that maintains a critical understanding of the politics of cultural difference.  Critical contrastive rhetoric explores issues such as critical thinking in teaching situations that challenge essentialism. It takes into consideration poststructuralist, postcolonial, and postmodern critiques of language and culture, in order to reconceptualize cultural difference in rhetoric. In practice, it "affirms multiplicity of languages, rhetorical forms, and students' identities, while problematizing the discursive construction of rhetoric and identities, and thus allowing writing teachers to recognize the complex web of rhetoric, culture, power, and discourse in responding to student writing."

Questions of relevance

In the early 2000s, some postmodern and critical pedagogy writers in the second language writing field, began referring to contrastive rhetoric as if it had been frozen in space.  Over the years, the term contrastive rhetoric had started to gain a negative connotation, even negatively affecting writing in a second language.  Understood by many as Kaplan's original work, contrastive rhetoric was increasingly characterized as static, and linked to contrastive analysis, a movement associated with structural linguistics and behavioralism.  Many of the contributions made to contrastive rhetoric from the late 1960s to the early 1990s have been ignored.  In a 2002 article, Connor attempted to address these criticisms and to offer new directions for a viable contrastive rhetoric.  In addressing the critiques, she aimed to draw attention to the broad scope of contrastive rhetoric and determined that a new term would better encompass the essence of contrastive rhetoric in its current state.  To distinguish between the often-quoted "static" model and the new advances that have been made, Connor suggests it may be useful to begin using the term intercultural rhetoric instead of contrastive rhetoric to refer to the current models of cross-cultural research.

According to Connor, the term intercultural rhetoric better describes the broadening trends of expression across languages and cultures.  It preserves the traditional approaches that use textual analysis, genre analysis, and corpus analysis, yet also introduces ethnographic approaches that examine language in interactions.  Furthermore, it connotes the analysis of texts that allows for dynamic definitions of culture and the inclusion of smaller cultures (e.g., disciplinary, classroom) in the analysis.

While Connor continues to use the term intercultural rhetoric, scholars outside the United States looking at specific language differences (e.g. English and Japanese and English and Spanish) consider this to be a loaded label and continue to use the term contrastive rhetoric for the distinctiveness the theory shows and for the freedom of using tools to assess and understand the field in a non-restrictive manner.

See also 
Applied linguistics
Contrastive linguistics
Kishōtenketsu
Second language acquisition

References 

Language education
Second-language acquisition
Language comparison
Discourse analysis